The Blériot-SPAD S.60 was a French fighter aircraft developed in the late 1920s.

Design and development
The S.60 was a two-seat biplane fighter of all-wood construction with a canvas coating and a monocoque fuselage. The upper wing was backswept, while the lower wing was unswept. Three prototypes were ordered on December 24, 1925, and the first prototype flew on June 26, 1926, but stability problems meant that the S.60 was rejected for production in favor of the improved S.70.

Specifications

See also

References

 

Fighter aircraft
Biplanes
1920s French fighter aircraft
S.60
Single-engined tractor aircraft
Aircraft first flown in 1926